Frederick Henry "Baldy" Brown (September 15, 1900 — January 20, 1970), known as Fred Brown, was a Canadian professional ice hockey player who played nine games in the National Hockey League with the Montreal Maroons during the 1927–28 season. The rest of his career, which lasted from 1924 to 1931, was spent in various minor leagues. He was born in Kingston, Ontario.

Career statistics

Regular season and playoffs

External links
 

1900 births
1977 deaths
Canadian ice hockey left wingers
Ice hockey people from Ontario
Kitchener Flying Dutchmen players
Montreal Maroons players
Niagara Falls Cataracts players
Ontario Hockey Association Senior A League (1890–1979) players
Sportspeople from Kingston, Ontario
Stratford Nationals players
Syracuse Stars (IHL) players
Windsor Bulldogs (1929–1936) players
Windsor Bulldogs (CPHL) players